Hakim Rigi (also Romanized as Ḩakīm Rīgī; also known as Deh-e Rīgī) is a village in Dust Mohammad Rural District, in the Central District of Hirmand County, Sistan and Baluchestan Province, Iran. At the 2006 census, its population was 36, in 11 families.

References 

Populated places in Hirmand County